Guðrún is one of the most frequently given female names in Iceland. In 2004, it was ranked first before Anna and Sigríður.

According to Icelandic custom, people are generally referred to by first and middle names and patronyms are used if disambiguation is required.

The name is earliest attested in a runestone as  kuþrun. In Old Norse, Goðrún was an alternative version. The Faroese equivalent is Guðrun and the mainland Scandinavian version is Gudrun. The Old Norse name is composed of the elements guð or goð, meaning "god"; and rūn, meaning "rune", "secret lore". The Scandinavian Gudrun was revived in the last half of the 19th century.

Famous people called Guðrún
Guðrún Gjúkadóttir, person in the Eddic poems
Guðrún Ósvífursdóttir (fl. C10-C11), protagonist of the Medieval Icelandic Laxdœla saga
Guðrún Bjarnadóttir, Icelandic Miss International in 1963
Guðrún Helgadóttir (born 1935), Icelandic politician and writer of children's literature
Guðrún Eva Mínervudóttir (born 1976), Icelandic writer
Guðrún Ögmundsdóttir (1950–2019), Icelandic politician
Guðrún Katrín Þorbergsdóttir, First Lady of Iceland (1996–1998)
Guðrún Lárusdóttir (1880-1938), Icelandic politician and writer

Gudrun
Ella Gudrun Ingeborg Holleufer (1906–1954), Danish first lady
Gudrun Abt (born 1962), German hurdler
Gudrun Berend (1955–2011), German hurdler
Gudrun Boysen (born 1939), Danish physician
Gudrun Brost (1910–1993), Swedish actress
Gudrun Burwitz (1929–2018), German neo-Nazi
Gudrun Corvinus (1931–2006), German archaeologist
Gudrun Ensslin (1940–1977), German terrorist
Gudrun Gut (born 1957), German musician
Gudrun Landgrebe (born 1950), German actress
Gudrun Pausewang (1928–2020), German writer
Gudrun Scholz (born 1940), German field hockey player
Gudrun Schyman (born 1948), Swedish politician
Gudrun Tandberg Høykoll (1924–2005), Norwegian politician
Gudrun Ure (born 1926), Scottish actress
Gudrun Wagner (1944–2007), German theatre manager
Gudrun Zapf-von Hesse (1918–2019), German calligrapher
Gudrun Zollner (born 1960), German politician

See also
Gudrun, major figure in early Germanic literature

References

Feminine given names
Icelandic feminine given names